Sandra Beltrán may refer to:

 Sandra Ávila Beltrán (born 1960), Mexican drug cartel leader
 Sandra Beltrán (actress) (born 1975), Colombian actress